Douglas Foshee is an American businessman.

Career
Foshee earned a bachelor's degree from Southwest Texas State University in 1982 and an MBA from Rice University in 1992. Foshee worked for ARCO International Oil and Gas as an energy lender and served as CEO of Torch Energy Advisors. Foshee became CEO of Nuevo Energy in 1997, but quit in 2000 after Nuevo's board decided to pay his bonus in stock options instead of in cash. In 2001, Foshee became the CFO of Halliburton, where he handled an SEC investigation and litigation regarding asbestos. In 2003, El Paso Corp. hired Foshee as its CEO. In 2012, Foshee served as the lead negotiator for El Paso in Kinder Morgan's purchase of El Paso. Shareholders of El Paso sued to stop the merger, alleging that Foshee had failed to get the best price for El Paso, but Delaware judge Leo E. Strine Jr. allowed the deal to go through.

Foshee has served as a director or trustee for Cameron International Corporation, AIG Credit Facility Trust, EP Energy LLC, and El Paso Corp. Foshee served as a trustee of AIG after it was bailed out by the government in 2008.

Other activities
Foshee donated $750,000 to Jeb Bush's 2016 presidential candidacy.

References

Living people
American businesspeople
Texas State University alumni
Rice University alumni
Jesse H. Jones Graduate School of Business alumni
Year of birth missing (living people)